Alexandru Ionuț Stoica (born 23 January 2000) is a Romanian professional footballer who plays as a forward for FC Voluntari.

References

External links
 
 

2000 births
Living people
Footballers from Bucharest
Romanian footballers
Romania youth international footballers
Association football forwards
FC Rapid București players
Liga I players
FC Voluntari players
Liga II players
CS Balotești players
FCV Farul Constanța players
AFC Unirea Slobozia players